The Rosalind and Morris Goodman Cancer Research Centre is a biomedical research institution affiliated with McGill University's Faculty of Medicine in Montreal, Quebec, Canada. It was established in 1978. They maintain close relationships with the many hospitals and departments in the area. Their 5 core themes of research include: 

•    Breast cancer   
•    Embryonic development and cancer
•    Cancer stem cells and signalling
•    Metabolism and cancer
•    DNA damage and apoptosis (programmed cell death)

As of 2014, they are made up of 26 full faculty members and 31 associate members.

Professor Nahum Sonenberg, winner of the Wolf Prize, is a senior researcher at the centre.

References

Cancer organizations based in Canada